Property Of.. is the fourth album by Swedish heavy metal band Syron Vanes, released in 2007. It was produced by Rimbert Vahlstroem.

Story 

The album is the only Syron Vanes album without Anders Hahne who left the band for a long break right after the album Insane in 2003.

Album 

Property Of.. was released 2007. The album got some nice reviews, Gary Hill at Music Street Journal wrote:
Well, as strong as this disc is, I can sure see why. If you are a fan of old school metal you’ll certainly love this album. It rocks out with the best of them and will probably be near the top of my list of best metal discs of the year.

Track listing
Insane

Personnel 
Syron Vanes

 Rimbert Vahlstroem — Guitar/Lead Guitar — Lead Vocals
 Staffan Lindstedt — Drums
 Michel Strand — Bass

Production

 Produced by Rimbert Vahlstroem
 Mixing Engineer Anders Hahne
 Recording Engineer Rimbert Vahlstroem
 Mastering EngineerCutting Room Stockholm
 Sleeve artwork by Rimbert Vahlstroem
 Photography by 
 Published by Record Heaven

References

External links 
 Official Syron Vanes website

Syron Vanes albums
2007 albums